Amir Khajepour Is a Professor of Mechanical Engineering at University of Waterloo. He holds Tier 1 Canada Research Chair in Mechatronics Vehicle Systems.
He is Co-author of Laser Cladding book published by CRC Press.

Education
PhD: University of Waterloo, 1996
MASc: Sharif University of Technology, 1992
BASc: Ferdowsi University of Mashad, 1989

Selected/Recent Publications
A. Fathi, E. Toyserkani, A. Khajepour, and M. Durali, "Prediction of melt pool depth and dilution in laser powder deposition" Journal of Physics D: Applied Physics, Vol. 39, pp. 2613–2623, 2006.
Behzadipour, S., and Khajepour, A., "Time-Optimal Trajectory Planning in Cable-based Manipulators", IEEE Transactions on Robotics, Volume 22, Issue 3, June 2006 Page(s):559 - 563.
Behzadipour, S., Khajepour, A., "Causality in Vector Bond Graphs and its Application to Modeling of Multi-Body Dynamic Systems", Journal of Simulation Modelling Practice and Theory, Volume 14, Issue 3, April 2006, Pages 279-295.
Behzadipour, S., Khajepour, A., "Stiffness of Cable-based Parallel Manipulators with Application to Stability Analysis", ASME Journal of Mechanical Design, 128, 303 (2006).
Motiee, M., Mansour, R. R., and Khajepour, A., "Novel MEMS Filters For On-Chip Transceiver Architecture, Modeling and Experiments", Journal of Micromechanics and Microengineering, 16 (2006), pp. 407–418.

References

Academic staff of the University of Waterloo
Living people
Canada Research Chairs
Year of birth missing (living people)